The Ministry of Social Affairs and Labour is the main authority administrating labour affairs and social matters, including labour inspection, and a department of the Government of Syria.

Responsibility 
The ministry is responsible for labor and employment, occupational health and safety, employment in the public sector, family empowerment, poverty reduction and livelihood support, development of the social protection system and social security system, and the provision of social protection and care for the most vulnerable or vulnerable social groups.

Organisation 
The Directorates of the Ministry:

 Directorate of Associations and Private Institutions
 Social Protection Directorate
 Rural Development Directorate
 Directorate of Labor Inspection, Health and Safety
 Labor Relations Directorate
 Manpower Directorate
 Directorate of Labor Market Observatory
 Directorate of Technology and Information Systems
 Directorate of Technical and Engineering Affairs
 Legal Affairs Directorate
 Directorate of Administrative Affairs
 Directorate of Planning and International Cooperation
 Directorate of Administrative Development
 Directorate of Internal Control

Regional Oganisation
The MOSAL is decentralized in its main structure and is represented in of the 14 regional departments by a regional Directorate of Social Affairs, which has social, employment and inspection functions.

Ministers

References 

2016 establishments in Syria
Government ministries of Syria
Social affairs ministries
Labor in Syria
Ministries established in 2016
Organizations based in Damascus